Pingtung is a railway station in Pingtung County, Taiwan served by Taiwan Railways.

Overview

The station has two island platforms. The station was rebuilt on elevated tracks on 23 August 2015.

History
5 October 1962: Station rebuilt.
23 August 2015: Station rebuilt on elevated tracks.

Platform layout

Station Layout

Around the station
 National Pingtung University, Minsheng Campus
 Pingtung Art Museum
 Pingtung County Government
 Pingtung County Council
 Pingtung Performing Arts Center
 Pingtung Tutorial Academy
 Zhong-Sheng-Gong Memorial
 Pingtung Night Market
 Tangrong Elementary School
 Zhongzheng Elementary School
 Bus transfer stations

See also
 List of railway stations in Taiwan

References

External links 

TRA Pingtung Station 
TRA Pingtung Station

Railway stations served by Taiwan Railways Administration
Railway stations in Pingtung County
Railway stations opened in 1913
1913 establishments in Taiwan